Maine Central Railroad Class N locomotives were intended for main line passenger service. They were of 4-6-0 wheel arrangement in the Whyte notation, or "2'C" in UIC classification. All were built at the Schenectady Locomotive Works which became the American Locomotive Company (ALCO) in 1901. They replaced earlier class L 4-4-0 locomotives beginning in 1899. They were transferred to branch line passenger service as replaced by class C 4-6-2 locomotives beginning in 1907. Most were scrapped during the Great Depression and none survived World War II.

References 

Steam locomotives of the United States
4-6-0 locomotives
ALCO locomotives
Schenectady Locomotive Works locomotives
N 4-6-0
Railway locomotives introduced in 1899
Scrapped locomotives
Standard gauge locomotives of the United States